Sergei Kharkov AKA Sergej Charkov (born 17 November 1970) is a Russian gymnast, Olympic champion and world champion. He competed for the Soviet Union and the Russian Federation before immigrated to Germany where he won the national championship 8 times. Since retiring from competition he coaches the TG Saar gymnastics team in Saarbrücken and performs in sport shows. Kharkov is married with 2 children and lives in Dillingen, Germany.

Olympics
Kharkov competed for the Soviet Union at the 1988 Summer Olympics in Seoul where he received gold medals in floor exercises and in team all-around.

He competed for Russia at the 1996 Summer Olympics in Atlanta, where he received a gold medal in team combined exercises.

World championships
Kharkov won a gold medal in horizontal bar and a silver medal in individual all-around at the 1993 World Artistic Gymnastics Championships in Birmingham.

Competitive record
1988 Olympic Games: 1st fx, 1st Team
1990 European Championships: 2nd all around, 2nd fx, 3rd pommel horse
1992 European Championships: 1st team
1993 European Championships: 2nd all around, 1st high bar
1995 German Championships: 3rd all around, 1st fx, 1st vault, 1st parallel bars
1996 Olympic Games: 1st team
1997 German Championships: 1st all around, 2nd parallel bars, 3rd rings
1998 German Championships: 1st fx, 1st vault, 3rd high bar
1999 German Championships: 1st fx, 1st vault, 3rd high bar
2001 German Championships: 1st parallel bars, 2nd high bar, 3rd rings

See also
List of Olympic male artistic gymnasts for Russia

References

External links
 https://web.archive.org/web/20110719074729/http://www.rentasportstar.de/steckbriefe_sergej_charkov.htm

1970 births
Living people
Gymnasts from Moscow
Russian male artistic gymnasts
Soviet male artistic gymnasts
Olympic gymnasts of the Soviet Union
Olympic gymnasts of Russia
Gymnasts at the 1988 Summer Olympics
Gymnasts at the 1996 Summer Olympics
Olympic gold medalists for the Soviet Union
Olympic gold medalists for Russia
Olympic medalists in gymnastics
Medalists at the 1996 Summer Olympics
Medalists at the 1988 Summer Olympics
Medalists at the World Artistic Gymnastics Championships